As Variedades de Proteu is a play by António José da Silva that deals with the intricacies of marriage and love. It uses the mythological characters of Proteus (Πρωτεύς) and Nereus and includes curious characters such as the witty Caranguejo (Portuguese for crab). The play was staged for the first time in 1737 in Lisbon.

References 

1737 plays
Portuguese plays